EWW may refer to:
Emacs Web Wowser
English world wide
English writing wizard
Every Witch Way
extended work week
Ewell West railway station, Surrey, England, by National Rail station code
Extreme wind warning
Elinor Wonders Why